"Are We in Trouble Now" is a song by Mark Knopfler from his 1996 debut solo album, Golden Heart. The same year, it was recorded by American country music artist Randy Travis as the first single from the album Full Circle.  This version reached number 24 on the Billboard Hot Country Singles & Tracks chart.

Music video
The music video was directed by Jim Shea and premiered in 1996. It was filmed on the Veluzat Ranch in Saugus, California.

Chart performance
"Are We in Trouble Now" debuted at number 68 on the U.S. Billboard Hot Country Singles & Tracks chart for the week of 15 June 1996.

References

1996 singles
1996 songs
Mark Knopfler songs
Randy Travis songs
Songs written by Mark Knopfler
Song recordings produced by Kyle Lehning
Warner Records Nashville singles